Trickster is the seventh extended play by South Korean boy band Oneus. It was released by RBW and distributed by Kakao Entertainment on May 17, 2022. The EP contains seven tracks, including the lead single, "Bring It On".

Background and release 

In February 2022, Oneus began their US tour, with twelve stops including major cities such as New York City and Los Angeles and smaller cities such as Wilkes-Barre and Lawrence. 

In April, Oneus announced two stops to continue their Blood Moon tour, holding their third Japanese concert with a show in Chiba and in Osaka. They also announced a comeback with their seventh EP Trickster, which was released May 17 along with the lead single "Bring It On".

Track listing

Charts

Weekly charts

Monthly charts

Year-end charts

Release history

References 

2022 EPs
Korean-language EPs
Oneus albums